Always Summer is the first single from the American rock band Yellowcard's eighth studio album Southern Air. The album was released on August 14, 2012. The song premiered May 21, 2012 on AbsolutePunk at 8:00 PM EST. The site received enough viewers to crash it for about fifteen minutes. AbsolutePunk also said that the premiere drew more visitors to the site than any other time over the past two years. The song was then made available for purchase on iTunes and Amazon the next day. It has received positive reviews. The music video was released on June 20, 2012. It is the first video to feature new bassist Josh Portman.

Chart performance

References

Yellowcard songs
2012 singles
Songs written by Ryan Key
2012 songs
Song recordings produced by Neal Avron
Hopeless Records singles